Leuggelbach railway station is a railway station in the municipality of Glarus Süd in the Swiss canton of Glarus. It takes its name from the nearby village of Leuggelbach. The station is situated on the Weesen to Linthal railway line, and served by the hourly Zürich S-Bahn service S25 between Zurich and Linthal.

References 

Railway stations in the canton of Glarus
Swiss Federal Railways stations